The Ambassador of Malaysia to the Republic of the Philippines is the head of Malaysia's diplomatic mission to the Philippines. The position has the rank and status of an Ambassador Extraordinary and Plenipotentiary and is based in the Embassy of Malaysia, Manila.

List of heads of mission

Ambassadors to the Philippines

See also
 Malaysia–Philippines relations

References 

 
Philippines
Malaysia